Manitoba Provincial Road 210 (PR 210) is a provincial road in southeastern Manitoba, Canada.  Although numbered as a north-south route, PR 210 is both a north-south and an east-west route.

Route description
It runs north to Woodridge, then turns northwest, passing through the Sandilands Provincial Forest to La Broquerie, where it meets PR 302 and the eastern terminus of PTH 52. It runs through La Broquerie and then continues northwest to the town of Ste. Anne.  

At Ste. Anne, PR 210 becomes an east-west route.  It meets PTH 12 again just west of Ste. Anne before continuing west to Landmark, PTH 59, and St. Adolphe.  PR 210 crosses the Pierre Delorme Bridge over the Red River at St. Adolphe and ends one kilometre west at PTH 75.  

PR 210 runs short concurrences with other provincial roads on three occasions: with PR 302 through La Broquerie, with PR 207 through Ste. Anne, and with PR 206 through Landmark.  While the majority of PR 210 is now paved, the road south of Woodridge remains a gravel road.  PR 210 between PTH 59 and PTH 75 was formerly a separate route prior to 1985, designated as PR 429.

Between PR 206 and PTH 59, PR 210 has a Class A1 loading designation from the Manitoba highways department.  This allows trucks to continue using this stretch of PR 210 even when springtime weight restrictions are in effect.

References

External links
Official Manitoba Highway Map

210